Hosting may refer to:
 To act as the organizer or master of ceremonies for an event
 Self-hosting (compilers), software distribution which provides all necessary source code to enable itself to be re-compiled from scratch
 Internet hosting service, including:
Web hosting service, service that makes the website accessible via the World Wide Web
 Shared web hosting service, web hosting service where many websites reside on one webserver
 Software as a service, model in which software is licensed on a subscription basis and is centrally hosted
 Dedicated hosting service, Internet hosting in which the client leases an entire server
 One-click hosting

See also
 Host (disambiguation)
 Hosted desktop
 Hosted Exchange
 Hosted payload
 Hosting environment